Alpenus auriculatus is a moth of the family Erebidae. It was described by Watson in 1989. It is found in South Africa.

References

Endemic moths of South Africa
Moths described in 1989
Spilosomina
Moths of Africa